Leanda Hendricks (born 3 May 1963) is a South African archer. She competed in the women's individual and team events at the 1996 Summer Olympics.

References

External links
 

1963 births
Living people
South African female archers
Olympic archers of South Africa
Archers at the 1996 Summer Olympics
Sportspeople from Johannesburg